Anthony L. Stanford (1830–1883) was a state senator in Arkansas from 1877 until 1880. He was born in New Jersey. He was a Republican in 1877 and a Greenback in 1879. He was an ordained member of the African Methodist Episcopal (AME) Church. He had a medical degree from Eclectic Medical College of Philadelphia.

He was involved in the emigration program returning African Americans to Africa.

References

1830 births
1883 deaths
Republican Party Arkansas state senators
African Methodist Episcopal Church clergy
Arkansas Greenbacks
People from New Jersey
19th-century American clergy